On September 6, 2018, a mass shooting occurred in Cincinnati, Ohio, United States. At 9:10 AM EDT, Omar Santa-Perez opened fire with a Taurus PT-809E 9mm pistol equipped with standard and hollow-point ammunition, in the lobby of the Fifth Third Center in Cincinnati, Ohio, killing three people. He was then shot and killed by responding police officers.

Perpetrator
Omar Enrique Santa-Perez, 29, was a U.S. citizen born in San Juan, Puerto Rico. Leading up to the incident, Santa-Perez had a history of employment and mental health problems, twice being sent by a judge to be evaluated by mental health professionals. It is unclear whether he attended these evaluations voluntarily. Neighbours described Santa-Perez as "increasingly bitter" in the weeks leading up to the shooting after struggling to hold down a job. Three months prior to the shooting, federal magistrate Karen Litkovitz threw out a lawsuit Santa-Perez had filed against CNBC Universal Media LLC and TD Ameritrade Holding Corp in December 2017 quoting it to be "rambling, difficult to decipher and borders on delusional". In the lawsuit, Santa-Perez alleged that CNBC and TD Ameritrade, through tapping of his personal electronic devices, had uncovered his identity and published it online. There is no evidence of any mention or allusion of him by CNBC prior to the shooting. As part of this lawsuit, Santa-Perez initially demanded more than $5 million in damages, though he later reduced his demand to $3.3 million in federal court. Santa-Perez was also required to disclose his financial holdings as part of the lawsuit, which when asked if he had "any cash on hand or money in savings, checking or other account," he checked "No". He also claimed he had about $700 in stocks and owed about $800 to T-Mobile and University of Cincinnati Health.

Incident
Prior to the attack, Santa-Perez had entered a sandwich shop and potentially visited other businesses in the building, before returning to the bank and opening fire. Those killed in the attack were identified as two bank employees and a contractor. Two other victims were injured in the attack. Santa-Perez's gun reportedly jammed at least once during his shooting spree.  This gave officers enough time to approach the Center's main lobby, where they encountered an active shooter situation, with Santa-Perez firing into the lobby. Four of the responding officers engaged the shooter with their weapons, striking Santa-Perez multiple times. Body camera footage of the shooting released by the Cincinnati Police Department showed Santa-Perez indiscriminately shooting at any person he saw, and the gunman was later shot dead through a glass pane by police. The Hamilton County Coroner told reporters "The aggressor had one weapon, but a whole lot of rounds of ammunition. And he didn't hesitate to pull the trigger, empty his magazine, release and do it over and over again."

Victims 
One of the victims was reported deceased by first responders at the scene, while two others were declared deceased after arriving at the University of Cincinnati Medical Center. Two other victims were also transported, with one listed in critical condition and the other in fair.

Investigation
Speaking at a press conference, Cincinnati mayor John Cranley stated that initial reports appeared to show that the victims were shot at random and that, "it didn't appear to be a dispute between people."

During the initial investigation, it was discovered by police that the shooter was carrying hundreds of rounds of ammunition and "...could've killed over 100 people." Body camera footage was released by law enforcement on September 8, which documented the officers' actions when they encountered the gunman.

References

2018 in Ohio
2018 mass shootings in the United States
2018 murders in the United States
Attacks in the United States in 2018
Crimes in Cincinnati
Deaths by firearm in Ohio
Mass shootings in the United States
Mass shootings in Ohio
September 2018 crimes in the United States
September 2018 events in the United States
Filmed killings
2018 active shooter incidents in the United States